Ahmose-Sitamun or Sitamun was a princess of the early Eighteenth Dynasty of Egypt.

Etymology 
Name of this princess means "Child of the Moon, Daughter of Amun".

Biography 
Sitamun was the daughter of Pharaoh Ahmose I and sister of Amenhotep I. A colossal statue of hers stood before the eighth pylon at Karnak.

Her mummy was found in the Deir el-Bahari cache (DB320) and is today in  the Egyptian Museum, Cairo.

Her titles were: God's Wife; King's Daughter; King's Sister.

Sources
Aidan Dodson & Dyan Hilton: The Complete Royal Families of Ancient Egypt, Thames & Hudson, 2004, p. 129

16th-century BC Egyptian women
16th-century BC clergy
Princesses of the Eighteenth Dynasty of Egypt
Ancient Egyptian mummies
Children of Ahmose I
Ancient Egyptian priestesses